The Kamchatka is the longest river in Kamchatka peninsula, located in Kamchatka Krai in the Russian Far East. It flows into the Pacific Ocean at the town Ust-Kamchatsk, on the east coast of Kamchatka. The river is rich with salmon, millions of which spawn yearly and which once supported the settlements of the native Itelmen.

Climate
Like most of its namesake peninsula, the basin of the Kamchatka River has at low altitudes a subarctic climate (Köppen Dfc) with short, cool to comfortable summers and freezing, snowy winters.

References

Rivers of Kamchatka Krai
Drainage basins of the Pacific Ocean